George G. Anderson (1839 – May 8, 1884) is best known for making the first ascent to the summit of Half Dome in Yosemite National Park in California, United States on October 12, 1875. During the climb, he drilled the holes which, after 1919, came to house the cables of the popular route up Half Dome. A pioneer without the benefit of modern climbing gear or techniques, Anderson worked barefoot, and placed iron spikes drilled into the rock for protection. The ascent took him days on end.
His one-room log cabin, originally located at what is now Foresta just west of Yosemite Valley, was moved to the Pioneer Yosemite History Center in Wawona where it continues to be preserved.

See also
History of rock climbing

References

American mountain climbers
Sierra Nevada (United States)
People from Montrose, Angus
1839 births
1884 deaths